Dream House is a Commodore 64 video game created by Joyce Hakansson Associates, released in 1984 by CBS Electronics. It allows the player to design and test the house of his or her dreams.

Gameplay

From the sinks to the wall colors, from the roof to the various amounts of home appliances like dishwashers and dryers, nearly everything is a choice for the player. One of the rooms even features a secret passageway. Players can choose from a colonial farmhouse and other realistic properties. Every house has a living room, a kitchen, two bedrooms, and a bathroom. The game includes details such as a weather vane and a windmill on the barns.

Reception
Commodore Microcomputers stated that "Dream House is not exactly a game ... but it is just as entertaining and challenging as any traditional game out there". The reviewer concluded that it "has not replaced nor diminished my old stand-by dream-weaving habitual hobby" of drawing homes on graph paper, but "with Dream House, dreaming comes that much closer to coming true".

References

1984 video games
Commodore 64 games
Commodore 64-only games
Simulation video games
Single-player video games
Video games developed in the United States